Duya is a village in Ye Township in Mawlamyine District in the Mon State of south-east Burma (Myanmar).

Notes

External links
 "Duya Map — Satellite Images of Duya" Maplandia World Gazetteer

Populated places in Mon State